Vittina turrita is a species of aquatic snail, a gastropod mollusk in the family Neritidae.

Distribution
Vittina turrita is Indo-Pacific in distribution, with specimens recorded from locations including Madagascar, Papua New Guinea, the Pacific Islands, Indonesia, Vietnam, and Japan.

Description
Native to brackish tidal waters such as mangrove swamps, this snail is also classified as Vittina turrita, and is sold in the freshwater aquarium trade under the common name "tiger nerite" or "tiger snail." Adults may thrive in fresh water with sufficient dissolved minerals. The species has separate male and female individuals; females lay eggs, which hatch into larvae that can survive only in brackish water. Adults grow to about 2.5 cm, and show a pale tan body with a darker tan shell, sometimes brownish or reddish, marked by black bands of varied width. The head has two short antennae which protrude from beneath the shell, each with a small eye at the base (generally invisible beneath the shell). Nerites are slow-moving snails that travel over rocks or hard substrates and do not burrow. Like other members of its genus, the species grazes on algae which it rasps from surfaces with its radula. It may opportunistically feed on other debris, but does not pursue animal food. Because a variety of common names including "zebra nerite" can be used to refer to both species, it is sometimes confused with Neritina natalensis.

Human use
Vittina turrita is common in the pet trade for freshwater aquaria. It is considered a desirable snail for home aquarists because of its attractive pattern, compatible requirements with common freshwater aquarium fish, and the fact that it consumes algae without eating plants or overpopulating in home freshwater tanks.

References

 Eichhorst T.E. (2016). Neritidae of the world. Volume 2. Harxheim: Conchbooks. Pp. 696-1366.

External links
 Gmelin J.F. (1791). Vermes. In: Gmelin J.F. (Ed.) Caroli a Linnaei Systema Naturae per Regna Tria Naturae, Ed. 13. Tome 1(6). G.E. Beer, Lipsiae
 Fukumori, H.; Kano, Y. (2013). Evolutionary ecology of settlement size in planktotrophic neritimorph gastropods. Marine Biology. 161(1): 213-227

Neritidae
Taxa named by Johann Friedrich Gmelin